Mohamed Harrif Saleh (born 15 September 1988) is a Malaysian professional racing cyclist, who currently rides for UCI Continental team .

Major results

2007
 1st  Scratch, Asian Track Championships
 1st  Team pursuit, Southeast Asian Games
 1st Stage 2 Jelajah Malaysia
 Ho Chi Minh City Television Cup
1st Stages 7 & 12
 1st Stage 3 Tour of Negeri Sembilan
 3rd Overall Melaka Chief Minister Cup
1st Stage 2
2008
 1st Stage 2 Tour of South China Sea
2010
 1st Stage 8 Tour of Gippsland
 Tour of the Murray River
1st Stages 2, 7, 8 & 14
2011
 Southeast Asian Games
1st  Scratch
1st  Team pursuit
 1st Stage 3 Tour de Brunei
2012
 Jelajah Malaysia
1st Stages 4 & 5
 Tour of Vietnam
1st  Points classification
1st Stages 3 & 5
 3rd  Scratch, Asian Track Championships
 3rd Overall Tour de Brunei
1st Stage 4
2013
 Jelajah Malaysia
1st  Points classification
1st Stage 3
 1st Stage 3 Tour of Borneo
2014
 Jelajah Malaysia
1st  Points classification
1st Stage 5
 1st Stage 4 Sharjah International Cycling Tour
 10th Overall Tour of Taihu Lake
2015
 Southeast Asian Games
1st  Criterium
1st  Road race
 1st Stage 3 Tour de Filipinas
2016
 Tour of Thailand
1st Stages 3 & 4
 1st Stage 3 Jelajah Malaysia
 2nd Road race, National Road Championships
2017
 1st  Criterium, Southeast Asian Games
 1st Stage 5 Jelajah Malaysia
2018
 1st Stage 3 Sri Lanka T-Cup
 8th Overall Tour de Siak
2019
 1st Stage 2 Tour de Langkawi
 1st Stage 5 Tour de Selangor
2020
 Tour de Langkawi
1st Stages 5 & 7
2021
 1st GP Manavgat
 4th GP Mediterrennean
2022
 Tour of Thailand
1st Stages 3 & 4
 1st Stage 5 Tour de Taiwan
 2nd Grand Prix Justiniano Hotels

References

External links

1988 births
Living people
Malaysian male cyclists
Cyclists at the 2006 Asian Games
Cyclists at the 2010 Asian Games
Southeast Asian Games medalists in cycling
Southeast Asian Games gold medalists for Malaysia
Competitors at the 2015 Southeast Asian Games
Asian Games competitors for Malaysia
20th-century Malaysian people
21st-century Malaysian people